Dr Lauchlann Glenn Black  is Tutor in English Literature and Senior Subject Tutor at Oriel College, Oxford. He teaches the main period papers (1500-1832). Dr Black holds a master's degree, (M.A.) and a doctorate (D.Phil.), taking his Bachelor's (B.A.) in Cape Town. Dr Black was Junior Proctor 1985–1986, Chairman of the General Board 1996–1999, Pro-Vice-Chancellor (Academic) 2000-2002 and a former Rhodes Scholar at Oxford University. His research interests lie in Renaissance poetry and rhetoric and manuscript circulation.

References 

Living people
Year of birth missing (living people)
Fellows of Oriel College, Oxford
University of Cape Town alumni